Steve Pickett (born c. 1961) is an American broadcast journalist, recipient of the Dallas Press Club Award for coverage of Hurricane Katrina, and of Emmy Award for coverage of War in Iraq.

Biography 

Steve Pickett graduated from John Marshall High School in 1979.  He was a news reporter at NBC affiliate television station KGW serving the Portland, Oregon metropolitan area, and now is reporter-anchorman at CBS owned-and-operated television station KTVT licensed to Fort Worth, Texas, and serving the Dallas-Fort Worth designated market area.  Pickett was the recipient of the Dallas Press Club Award for coverage of Hurricane Katrina, and of Emmy Award for coverage of War in Iraq, and has also received professional recognition from the National Association of Black Journalists, the Institute for Educational Inquiry for coverage of public education in the United States, the Poynter Institute, and the University of Oklahoma Black Alumni Society.

References 

African-American journalists
American male journalists
American political journalists
American television reporters and correspondents
American war correspondents
Journalists from Portland, Oregon
Television anchors from Portland, Oregon
Date of birth missing (living people)
Place of birth missing (living people)
1960s births
Living people
21st-century African-American people
20th-century African-American people